The Dnepr rocket was a space launch vehicle named after the Dnieper River. It was a converted ICBM used for launching artificial satellites into orbit, operated by launch service provider ISC Kosmotras.  The first launch, on April 21, 1999, successfully placed UoSAT-12, a 350 kg demonstration mini-satellite, into a 650 km circular Low Earth orbit.

History 

The Dnepr was based on the R-36MUTTH Intercontinental ballistic missile (ICBM)called the SS-18 Satan by NATOdesigned in the 1970s by the Yuzhnoe Design Bureau in Dnepropetrovsk, Ukrainian SSR.

The Dnepr control system was developed and produced by the JSC "Khartron", Kharkiv. The Dnepr was a three-stage rocket using storable hypergolic liquid propellants. The launch vehicles used for satellite launches have been withdrawn from ballistic missile service with the Russian Strategic Rocket Forces and stored for commercial use. A group of a total of 150 ICBMs were allowed under certain geopolitical disarmament protocols to be converted for use, and can be launched through 2020. The Dnepr was launched from the Russian-controlled Baikonur cosmodrome in Kazakhstan and the Dombarovsky launch base, near Yasny, in the Orenburg region of Russia.

In February 2015, following a year of strained relations including the Euromaidan and the Russo-Ukrainian war, Russia announced that it would sever its "joint program with Ukraine to launch Dnepr rockets and [was] no longer interested in buying Ukrainian Zenit boosters, deepening problems for [Ukraine's] space program and its struggling Yuzhmash factory." However ISC Kosmotras reported that they would continue to fulfill their obligations for three Dnepr launches in 2015, of which only one took place.

By the end of 2016, no further launch had materialized and the remaining customers had switched to alternative launch providers.

Billionaire Elon Musk tried to purchase refurbished Dnepr rockets for a low price from Russia but returned empty-handed after failing to find any that were affordable. This led him to the creation of a successful private rocket launch company called SpaceX.

Performance 
The Dnepr launch vehicle had only a small number of modifications compared to the R-36M ICBM in service. The main difference was the payload adapter located in the space head module and modified flight-control unit. This baseline version could lift 3,600 kg into a 300 km low Earth orbit at an inclination of 50.6°, or 2,300 kg to a 300 km Sun-synchronous orbit at an inclination of 98.0°. On a typical mission the Dnepr deployed a larger main payload and a secondary payload of Miniaturized satellites and CubeSats.

Launch history 
Before the Dnepr entered commercial service it was in service with the Strategic Rocket Forces which launched the ICBM version over 160 times with a reliability of 97%. The rocket had been used several times for commercial purposes with a single failure.

The Dnepr has at two points held the record for the most satellites orbited in a single launch; the April 2007 launch with 14 payloads held the record until 20 November 2013, when an American Minotaur I placed 29 satellites and two experiment packages into orbit. The next day a Dnepr re-took the record, placing 32 satellites and an experiment package bolted to the upper stage into low Earth orbit. This record was broken by an Antares launch in January 2014 which carried 34 spacecraft.

Launch failure 
The committee investigating the failed launch on July 26, 2006, concluded that the failure was caused by a malfunctioning of the pumping hydraulic drive of combustion chamber #4. The control malfunctioning brought about the disturbances, which led to the roll instability, excessive dispersions of the yaw and pitch angles. Thrust termination occurred at 74 seconds after lift-off. The crash site was located 150 km from the launch pad in an unpopulated area of Kazakhstan. Toxic propellants polluted the crash site, forcing Russia to pay US$1.1m in compensation. The rocket used for this launch was more than twenty years old. Procedures for launch have been changed to prevent future malfunctions of this kind.

See also
 Comparison of orbital launchers families
 Dnipro (anti-air missile)
 Minotaur (rocket family), US launch vehicles made from converted ICBMs

References

External links 

 
 
 
 
 

Yuzhmash space launch vehicles